Cayuga is a village in Cayuga County, New York, United States. The population was 549 at the 2010 census. The village derives its name from the indigenous Cayuga people and the lake named after them.

The village of Cayuga is in the western part of the town of Aurelius.

History 
The Sullivan Expedition of 1779 passed through the town. The village was incorporated in 1857, and re-incorporated in 1874.

The Hutchinson Homestead was listed on the National Register of Historic Places in 2009.

Geography

Cayuga is located on the eastern shore of the northern end of Cayuga Lake.

New York State Route 90 is a north–south highway through the village.

Demographics

At the 2000 census there were 509 people, 203 households, and 137 families in the village. The population density was 554.4 people per square mile (213.6/km). There were 240 housing units at an average density of 261.4 per square mile (100.7/km).  The racial makeup of the village was 99.02% White, 0.39% African American, 0.39% Native American, and 0.20% from two or more races. Hispanic or Latino of any race were 0.39%.

Of the 203 households 35.5% had children under the age of 18 living with them, 56.7% were married couples living together, 8.4% had a female householder with no husband present, and 32.5% were non-families. 29.6% of households were one person and 14.8% were one person aged 65 or older. The average household size was 2.51 and the average family size was 3.17.

The age distribution was 28.1% under the age of 18, 6.5% from 18 to 24, 25.7% from 25 to 44, 23.2% from 45 to 64, and 16.5% 65 or older. The median age was 39 years. For every 100 females, there were 92.8 males. For every 100 females age 18 and over, there were 85.8 males.

The median household income was $37,679 and the median family income  was $50,156. Males had a median income of $30,769 versus $21,667 for females. The per capita income for the village was $17,894. About 1.5% of families and 3.1% of the population were below the poverty line, including 3.1% of those under age 18 and none of those age 65 or over.

Notable people
 William Foote Whyte (in retirement), sociologist
 Marie Parcello, singer
 Rod Serling, creator of The Twilight Zone

References

External links
 Village of Cayuga webpage

Villages in Cayuga County, New York